The Pawtucket Times Building is an historic site at 23 Exchange Street in the historic central business district of Pawtucket, Rhode Island which is the home of the Pawtucket Times newspaper.

History

This five story masonry building was erected in 1895 to house the facilities of the Pawtucket Times, which was founded in 1885 and continues to operate from the building. In 1920 the Times added a large addition housing a printing plant, fronting on North Union Street. This was designed by Bellows & Aldrich of Boston. In 1948, a local architectural firm, the Dwight Seabury Company, was hired to alter the complex. The Seabury Company added a new printing plant addition, facing Montgomery Street. They also altered the original office block, removing the cornice and remodeling the lobby, among other work.

The architect of the original building is unknown, but it bears a strong resemblance to the Odd Fellows Building in Attleboro, designed by local architect Albert H. Humes in 1897 and burned in 1918. This was also a symmetrical, four-bay composition. It also feature an upper level with arched windows, identically arranged, with an awkward relationship with the lower levels.

The building was listed on the National Register of Historic Places in 1983.

Architecture
The main facade is faced in yellow brick with limestone trim. The first floor is divided into four bays, paired in size with the left one of the pair larger than the right. The entrance occupies the narrow bay on the far right, while the other bays are filled with windows and divided by limestone-faced piers. The next three floors also have four bays, but they are organized in mirror-image pairs, with a larger central bay with tripled windows flanked by an outer bay with a single sash window. The lintel treatments vary by floor; the windows on the fourth floor are round-arched. The fifth level is also organized in mirror-image paired bays, with the central bays each housing a row of four, small round-arch windows, and the outer bays only having two such windows. The building is topped by an elaborate dentillated cornice.

See also
 National Register of Historic Places listings in Pawtucket, Rhode Island
 The Times (Pawtucket)

Notes

References

Newspaper headquarters in the United States
Newspaper buildings
Commercial buildings on the National Register of Historic Places in Rhode Island
Buildings and structures in Pawtucket, Rhode Island
National Register of Historic Places in Pawtucket, Rhode Island
Historic district contributing properties in Rhode Island